The Karluk or Qarluq languages are a sub-branch of the Turkic language family that developed from the varieties once spoken by Karluks.

Many Middle Turkic works were written in these languages. The language of the Kara-Khanid Khanate was known as Turki, Ferghani, Kashgari or Khaqani. The language of the Chagatai Khanate was the Chagatai language.

Karluk Turkic was once spoken in the Kara-Khanid Khanate, Chagatai Khanate, Timurid Empire, Mughal Empire, Yarkent Khanate and the Uzbek-speaking Khanate of Bukhara, Emirate of Bukhara.

Classification

Languages

 Uzbek – spoken by the Uzbeks; approximately 44 million speakers 
 Uyghur – spoken by the Uyghurs; approximately 8-11 million speakers 
 Ili Turki – moribund language spoken by Ili Turkis, who are legally recognized as a subgroup of Uzbeks; 120 speakers and decreasing (1980)
 Chagatai – extinct language which was once widely spoken in Central Asia and remained the shared literary language there until the early 20th century.
 Karakhanid – literary language of the Kara-Khanid Khanate that is considered a standard form of Middle Turkic.
Khorezmian – literary language of the Golden Horde that is considered a preliminary stage of the Chagatai language.

Glottolog v4.7 refers to the Karluk languages as "Turkestan Turkic" and classifies them as follows:

References

 
Vowel-harmony languages

th:ภาษากลุ่มโอคุซ